Andreas Meyer may refer to:
 Andreas Meyer (ice hockey) (born 1954), Swiss ice hockey defenceman
 Andreas Meyer (manager) (born 1961), Swiss manager and lawyer
 Andreas Meyer-Hanno (1932–2006), German opera director
 Andreas Meyer-Landrut (born 1929), German diplomat
 Andreas Meyer, recording artist under the name Forma Tadre

See also  
 Andreas Mayer (disambiguation)